A Prince in a Pawnshop is a lost 1916 silent film directed by Paul Scardon and starring Barney Bernard. Vitagraph Company of America produced while it was released by Greater Vitagraph as a Blue Ribbon label.

Cast
Barney Bernard as David Solomon
Garry McGarry as Maurice
Bobby Connelly as Bobby
Charlotte Ives as Ethel
Edna Hunter as Mary Brown
Brinsley Shaw as Thomas W. Stevins
Lester Bernard as Abe Goldstein

References

External links

1916 films
American silent feature films
American black-and-white films
Lost American films
Films directed by Paul Scardon
Silent American drama films
1916 drama films
1916 lost films
Lost drama films
Vitagraph Studios films
1910s American films
1910s English-language films